List of airports in Congo may refer to:

List of airports in the Democratic Republic of the Congo
List of airports in the Republic of the Congo